Bread and Stones (German: Brot und Steine) is a 1979 Swiss drama film directed by Mark M. Rissi and starring Liselotte Pulver, Hans Rhyn and Beatrice Kessler.

Cast
  Liselotte Pulver  as Bodenbauers Mutter 
 Hans Rhyn  as Widimattbauern Hans 
 Beatrice Kessler  as Ursula 
 Walo Lüönd  as Bodenbauer 
 Sigfrit Steiner  as Tierarzt

References

Bibliography 
 Goble, Alan. The Complete Index to Literary Sources in Film. Walter de Gruyter, 1999.

External links 
 

1979 films
1979 drama films
Swiss drama films
Swiss German-language films
Films directed by Mark M. Rissi